Granulinidae are a family of small to medium-large sea snails, marine gastropod mollusks in the clade Neogastropoda.

Genera
In 2019 the subfamily Granulininae has been raised to rank of family Granulinidae G. A. Coovert & H. K. Coovert, 1995 (original rank).

This subfamily was originally placed in family Cystiscidae by Coovert & Coovert (1995) but placed back in Marginellidae, following La Perna (1999) and based on the morphology of living animals.
Granulina Jousseaume, 1888
Granulinella Boyer, 2017
Granulinopsis Boyer, 2017
Hiwia Marwick, 1931 †
Marginellopsis Bavay, 1911
Paolaura Smriglio & Mariottini, 2001
Pugnus Hedley, 1896
Gnera brought into synonymy
Cypraeolina Cerulli-Irelli, 1911: synonym of Granulina Jousseaume, 1888
Merovia Dall, 1921: synonym of Granulina Jousseaume, 1888
Microginella Laseron, 1957: synonym of Granulina Jousseaume, 1888

References

 Boyer F. (2017). Révision de l'organisation supra-spécifique des gastéropodes granuliniformes. Xenophora Taxonomy. 16: 25-38

 
Volutoidea